The Queens Presented by Kowa was a women's professional team golf tournament held in Japan. The tournament was contested by teams representing the tours of Japan, Korea, Australia and Europe. Hosts Japan led from start to finish to win the inaugural tournament 4–6 December 2015.

Format
The cup was played over three days with four teams of nine players each.

In 2015, there were 34 matches – eight four-balls day one, eight foursomes day two, and 18 singles on the final day. Three points were awarded for each win and one point for halved matches. This is a similar format to the Solheim Cup. The winner was based on cumulative score over all three days.

In 2016, the format changed in two ways. Two points were awarded for each win and one point for halved matches. Based on the score from the first two days (foursomes and four-balls), the leading two teams faced off on the third day in singles matches for the championship and the third and fourth place team played for third place.

In 2017, the format changed again. On the first day eight four-ball matches were played and on the second day nine singles matches were played. Based on the score from the first two days, the leading two teams faced off in foursomes on the third day for the championship and the third and fourth place team played for third place.

Winners

Results

2015
After the final round at Miyoshi Country Club in 2015, the Japanese team ended with 41 points, just three ahead of the Koreans, who won eight of their nine singles matches. The LET team finished third with the ALPG in fourth.

Source:

2016
After the first two rounds, Korea led with 12 points to Japan's 11 and they faced-off in the Championship singles on the final day. Europe, third with 7 points, faced Australia, with 2 points in the third-place match. Korea won seven of the eight singles matches and halved the other to win the Queens 15–1. Europe took third place with a 9–7 win over Australia.

Source:

2017
After the first two rounds, Korea led with 24 points to Japan's 12 and they faced-off in the Championship foursomes on the final day. Australia, third with 9 points, faced Europe, with 7 points, in the third-place match. Japan won three of the four foursomes matches and halved the other to win the Queens 7–1. Australia took third place with a 5–3 win over Europe.

Source:

Teams

References

External links
 

LPGA of Japan Tour events
LPGA of Korea Tour events
Former Ladies European Tour events
ALPG Tour events
Golf tournaments in Japan
Recurring sporting events established in 2015
Recurring sporting events disestablished in 2017
2015 establishments in Japan
2017 disestablishments in Japan